The painted stinkfish or painted dragonet (Eocallionymus papilio) is a species of dragonet endemic to the Indian Ocean coasts of Australia and Tasmania where it is found at a depth of about .  This species grows to a length of  TL.  This species is the only known member of its genus.

References

painted stinkfish
Marine fish of Southern Australia
Fish described in 1864
Taxa named by Albert Günther